Attorney General Carson may refer to:

James H. Carson Jr. (1935–2015), North Carolina Attorney General
Hampton L. Carson (lawyer) (1852–1929), Attorney General of Pennsylvania
Edward Carson (1854–1935), Attorney General for England and Wales

See also
General Carson (disambiguation)